Kim Chong-Hee  (1922–1981) was the founder of Hanwha Group and a leading figure of the South Korean explosives industry.

Korea Explosives Corporation 
Kim established the Korea Explosives Corporation, a forerunner of the Hanwha Corporation, in 1952. Recognizing that the explosives industry is essential to the country's industrial development, he devoted himself to the localization of explosives all his life. He succeeded in domestically producing dynamite in 1957, and began its commercial production from 1958, significantly contributing to South Korea's industrial growth by enabling the construction of the national infrastructure, including bridges, tunnels and highways.

Expansion
Outside the explosives industry, Kim also upgraded the domestic bearing industry to a world caliber status by taking over Shinhan Bearing Industrial in 1964 and advancing it forward, as well as leading the growth of the domestic petrochemical industry by establishing Korea Hwasung Industrial (currently, Hanwha Chemical and Hanwha L&C). He also made contributions to the development of South Korea's dairy industry by acquiring Daeil Dairy in 1973.

Diplomatic activities
Kim was also a pioneer in private diplomacy in South Korea. Kim was named an honorary consul-general to Greece in 1968, and in recognition of his contributions to advancing relations between the two countries, he was awarded the Venus Cross Medal of Honor, Greece's highest honorary medal, by the Greek government in 1972.

Business advocacy
Kim had been an active advocate of business, representing the Korean business community as the vice chairman of the Federation of Korean Industries from 1977 until he died at the age of 59 in 1981. The South Korean government posthumously awarded him a Gold Tower Order of Industrial Service Merit for his exceptional service to the country's economy.

Commemorations
As a pioneer of the explosives industry, Kim played a key role in South Korea's economic development. His life story was presented by the Korean Chamber of Commerce and Industry in its publication Hyeonam Kim Chong-Hee, a Pioneer of the Korean Explosives Industry, as a part of its series of comic books on the biographies of South Korean CEOs in 2009. A commemorative medal was also issued on his selection as a "Figure of Korea" by the Korea Mint Corporation.

External links
Hanwha Homepage
Hyonam Memorial Hall

1922 births
1981 deaths
South Korean chief executives
Hanwha
Recipients of the Order of Industrial Service Merit